Human–canine bonding is the relationship between dogs and humans. This relationship can be traced back to at least 15,000 years ago, to the Bonn-Oberkassel dog, who was found buried alongside two humans. For centuries, dogs have been considered man's best friend. This is most evident in western countries, such as the United States, where over 48% of households have a pet dog.

The human-canine relationship is not necessarily always a positive one; dogs can be viewed in an extremely negative light depending on the region. On average, females tend to have more positive attitudes toward dogs as opposed to males, and studies have demonstrated that both dogs and humans release oxytocin while spending time together. This release of oxytocin is correlated with the formation of a strong social bond. Canines are capable of discriminating between positive and negative human facial expressions and will react accordingly.  Dogs appear in religions all over the world, particularly in Mesoamerican folklore and myth, signifying the deep reverence humans all over the world and throughout history have for them.

Attachment 
Psychologists believe that the relationship between human and canine is a bidirectional attachment bond, which resembles that of the typical human caretaker/infant relationship, and shows all of the usual hallmarks of a typical bond. Some examples of behaviors that led scientists to this conclusion is the display of proximity seeking behavior where the canine will seek out its caretaker as a means to cope with stress, and consequently the absence of the caretaker will trigger separation anxiety to a varying degree.  Another such behavior is the safe haven effect, which describes when the canine more freely explores novel objects in the caretaker's presence. Canines are capable of assessing humans' emotional states, as well as discriminating humans by levels of familiarity.

Studies have demonstrated that shelter dogs benefit from interacting with complete strangers. These interactions result in a reduction in plasma cortisol, which is correlated to an overall reduction in stress. These results demonstrate the canines' innate desire to form an attachment with a human, and also demonstrate the positive health effects for the canine associated with the relationship.

Upon loss, due to death or retirement, the majority of caregivers report intense feelings of grief.

Research 

Human–canine bonding was recognized by Boris M. Levinson, who had an immense influence on the establishment of the field of study. Levinson is known for accidentally discovering the benefits of assisted pet therapy. He found that withdrawn and uncommunicative children would interact positively whenever he brought his dog, Jingles, to their therapy sessions. His discovery was further reinforced by Sam and Elizabeth Corson, who were among the first to research and evaluate pet-facilitated therapy.

In the early 1980s the term 'human–animal bond' was officially coined by Leo K. Bustad, who delivered a summary lecture on the Human-Pet Relationship on October 28, 1983, at the International Symposium in Vienna. This symposium was held in honour of Konrad Lorenz, and during his lecture, Bustad praised him for his work on the human–animal bond and encouraged others to build on Lorenz's work on the subject. In the early 1970s, Konrad Lorenz had developed the field of ethology with his landmark research on the imprinting of behaviors in geese.

Bustad and other pet therapy advocates formed the Delta Society, which was built on the earlier work of Levinson and Croson. In the 1970s and 1980s, national and international conferences led to greater recognition of the human–animal bond. Since then, there has been widespread media coverage of animal-assisted activity and therapy programs and service dog training.

Types of relationships
Today dogs are mostly kept as household pets although there still remains a sizeable population of working dogs worldwide. Working dogs today perform a wider variety of jobs than ever before in history, working in fields such as explosive detection, therapy, and invasive species detection. Dogs are used for service due to their highly developed sense of smell; Research shows they can smell human emotions. A strong canine-human bond is formed between the dog and the handler while performing jobs together, a strong bond is required to safely and quickly perform their jobs. Many of the people who work with a canine partner will also live with them, which facilitates a strong bond between both partners. Many military dogs have also been adopted by their former handlers once they have been retired. Canine-human jobs span fields including hunting, herding, military, medical, and search.

Pets 
In the western world, dogs are most commonly found as household pets. The overwhelming majority of American dog owners report that they feel as if their dog is a member of the family. Many western owners allow their dogs to sleep in their beds with them and report lessened anxiety. In many eastern cultures the dog is regarded as unclean and the general consensus in those countries is that keeping a dog as a pet is impure. Almost universally positive outcomes are reported among those who keep dogs as pets. The human-canine bond is strengthened, or diminished, depending on the quantity and quality of the time spent with the canine and through activities such as routine walking, feeding, grooming, and play.

Herding 

The cattle dog has long worked alongside humans, with the start of herding activities roughly being around the time of the domestication of the sheep. Today's herding dogs have evolved a unique set of traits and mannerisms that makes them ideal for the job. Herding dogs may generally fall into several categories, these are protectors, drivers, headers, and heelers. Herding dogs rely on many predator skills such as posture and eye contact rather than brute force.

Hunting 
Hunting is one of the oldest jobs that dogs have performed alongside humans. Cave art dating back to the Neolithic age depicting dogs and humans hunting together has been found. Today hunting dogs generally fall into one of three categories; Terriers, gun dogs, and hounds. Terriers are smaller dogs which can be used to hunt small animals such as birds and rabbits. Gun dogs are mostly used during upland and wetland hunting to retrieve downed game. Hounds typically specialize in the chase and utilize a variety of noises to flush out game, used in hunting larger mammals such as deer, coyote, boar, and foxes.

Sledding 
Dog sledding began as a formal sport in North America in 1908, however the practice of using dogs to pull sleds dates back to at least 6000 BC. Remnants of sleds and harnesses has been found with canine remains in Siberia which carbon-dated to 7800–8000 years ago. A dog musher will need to develop a close bond sometimes with as many as 20 or more dogs in their kennel in order to keep a highly responsive and loyal team. The musher will need to cultivate a particularly strong relationship with their lead dog. The lead dog will ultimately decide which path the team takes.

Military 

Canines are employed worldwide in various militaries around the world where they perform a variety of jobs on land, sea, and in the air. In the United States of America the Army Veterinary Corps and the 341st Training Squadron provide the training and logistics for many of the handlers and canines. Lackland AFB has around 900 canines at any given time. The commander of the 341st Training Squadron, William Roberts, states their mission is "to produce a dog that patrols and detects, either narcotics or explosives". In the US, military working dogs are euthanized at retirement if they are deemed unfit for home life or show aggressive behaviors.

In the UK the 1st Military Working Dog Regiment provides trained dogs and handlers to support the armed forces in various operations, comprising 299 Regular soldiers and officers with the ability to surge to a maximum capacity of 384 Military Working Dogs.

The relationship between a soldier and his dog is often cited as deeply rooted and unshakable, with the result being that the handler and the dog can read almost imperceptible changes in each other's body language. In the US military the military working dog is traditionally one rank higher than his handler so that he is afforded the respect they deserve.

Examples of Military working dogs include:

 Guard dog
 Attack dog
 Mascot dog
 Detection dog
 Law Enforcement dog

Search 

Because of their highly developed sense of smell many canines today work with their handlers to search for many things including drugs, invasive species, and people. The first search and rescue dogs were the Saint Bernards who were trained to locate lost or stranded travelers in the Swiss Alps.

Dogs and their handlers will have formed a close bond allowing each other to interpret each other's body language correctly leading to the successful detection of the desired object or person. Examples of body language to look for when the dog begins to "hit" on the scent cone are small pauses, tail flicks, and puffing air with the noise. Every dog is different and will present different signals that will take lots of dedicated training from the handler to learn how to correctly interpret.

Assistance 

People who suffer from isolation, depression, and other mental illness to the point where it significantly interferes with day-to-day life may find security in an emotional support animal, however it is important to remember that usually dogs who fall into the emotional support animal category do not require any specific training. As a result of the studies by Dr. Samuel Corson pets have become commonplace in nursing homes where they can provide comfort and affection to people. Therapy dogs are used in hospitals around the world where they can have a positive impact on a variety of diagnoses, including cancer. 

examples of assistances dogs include:

 Guide dogs
 Hearing dogs
 Mobility assistance dogs
 Medical response dogs
 Seizure response dogs
 Autism assistance dogs
 Psychiatric response dogs

Health benefits 
A study conducted by J.S.J Odendaal in 2003 showed that when humans pet dogs, their bodies release oxytocin, a hormone associated with not only happiness, but bonding and affection as well. According to the social support theory, animals are a source of social support and companionship, which are necessary for well-being. Canines' social impact on humans is especially significant for those who tend to be more isolated, such as children with no siblings or elderly persons. In this view, the animal is part of our community and is an important determinant for psychological well-being.

According to self psychology, an animal can be a "self-object" that gives a sense of cohesion, support, or sustenance to a person's sense of self. Self-psychology explains why some animals are so crucial to a person's sense of self and well-being. Dog companionship often helps people to develop a daily routine and gives them something to look forward to each day. Studies also show owning a dog reduces stress, alleviates anxiety, and even can prolong a human's lifespan.

Abuse 
Despite the normally positive relationship, there are instances where dogs have turned on their owner or other humans. There are also instances where a normally positive relationship can result in a human abusing their canine, either psychologically or physically. The reasons for a human or a dog turning on their companion are diverse and poorly understood, but may be generally boiled down to improper socialization or underlying mental health issues for either party.

See also 
 Dogs portal
 Dog behavior
 Anthrozoology
 Dogs in religion
 Biophilia hypothesis
 Cat–dog relationship
 Interspecies friendship
 Cultural depictions of dogs
 Origin of the domestic dog

References

Further reading 

 
 Child development: Endenburg, Nienke & vanLith, Hein A. (2010). "The influence of animals on the development of children" The Veterinary Journal

Dogs
Canids and humans
Animal communication
Dogs in human culture